Nachos are a Mexican culinary dish  consisting of fried tortilla chips or totopos covered with melted cheese or cheese sauce, as well as a variety of other toppings and garnishes, often including meats (such as ground beef or grilled chicken), vegetables (such as chili peppers, lettuce, tomatoes, and olives), and condiments such as salsa, guacamole, or sour cream. At its most basic form, nachos may consist of merely chips covered with cheese, and served as an appetizer or snack, while other versions are substantial enough as a main course.  The dish was created by, and named after, Ignacio Anaya, who created them in 1941 for customers at the Victory Club restaurant in Piedras Negras, Coahuila.

History
Nachos originated in the city of Piedras Negras, Coahuila, just over the border from Eagle Pass, Texas. Ignacio "Nacho" Anaya created nachos at the Victory Club in 1940 when Mamie Finan, a regular customer, asked if Anaya could bring her, and three other women on a shopping trip from Eagle Pass, a different snack than usual.  In Spanish, "Nacho" is a common nickname for Ignacio. Anaya went to the kitchen and spotted freshly fried pieces of corn tortillas. In a moment of culinary inspiration, Anaya cut the tortillas into triangles, fried them, added shredded Colby cheese, quickly heated them, added sliced pickled jalapeño peppers, and served them. After tasting the snack, Finan asked what it was called. Anaya responded, "Well, I guess we can just call them Nacho's Special."

Anaya also opened his own restaurant, Nacho's Restaurant, in Piedras Negras. Anaya's original recipe was printed in the 1954 St. Anne's Cookbook.

The popularity of the dish swiftly spread throughout Texas and the Southwest. The first known appearance of the word "nachos" in English dates to 1950, from the book A Taste of Texas. According to El Cholo Spanish Cafe history, waitress Carmen Rocha is credited with making nachos in San Antonio, Texas, before introducing the dish to Los Angeles at the cafe in 1959.

A modified version of the dish, with cheese sauce and prepared tortilla chips, was marketed in 1976 by Frank Liberto, owner of Ricos Products, during Texas Rangers baseball games at Arlington Stadium in Arlington, Texas. This version became known as "ballpark nachos". During the September 4, 1978 Monday Night Football game between the Baltimore Colts and Dallas Cowboys, sportscaster Howard Cosell enjoyed the name "nachos," and made a point of mentioning the dish in his broadcasts over the following weeks, further popularizing it and introducing it to a whole new audience.
Liberto died in 2017.

Ignacio Anaya died in 1975. In his honor, a bronze plaque was erected in Piedras Negras, and October 21 was declared the International Day of the Nacho. Anaya's son, Ignacio Anaya, Jr., served as a judge at the annual nacho competition.

Nutritional information
The nutritional breakdown and total calorie count for a serving of nachos typically depends on the type of nacho, type of cheese, and additional toppings (such as beef, jalapeños, etc.) that are included in the serving. Most typical corn tortilla chips contain about 15 calories per chip. Baked corn tortilla chips have about 6 calories per chip, making them a healthier alternative option to the usual fried chip. Mexican-style cheddar cheese contains about 110 calories per ounce. Adding an additional source of protein, such as chicken or beef, increases the calorie count by about 100 calories or so. All in all, a single serving of nachos can contain from 300 to 600 total calories.

A single serving of nachos also contains significant amounts of fat, sodium, and calcium. There are around 16 grams of fat, 816 mg of sodium, and 272 mg of calcium per serving of nachos. In other words, one serving contains 39% of the daily value for fat, 34% of the daily value for sodium, and 27% of the daily value for calcium.

Variations

A variation consists of a quartered and fried tostada topped with a layer of refried beans or various meats and a layer of shredded cheese or nacho cheese, topped with habanero hot sauce.

Other variations include barbecue nachos (in which cheese is replaced with barbecue sauce) and poutine nachos (in which cheddar cheese is replaced with cheese curds and gravy). Although those variations use nontraditional ingredients, these versions are still classified as nachos.  In the US Southeast, pulled pork nachos, also called barbecue nachos, are very popular.  In this variation, the nachos retain their cheese and often jalapeños, but are also topped with pulled smoked pork shoulder served with or without barbecue sauce or hot sauce. Some Irish-themed restaurants and bars serve "Irish Nachos" with toppings placed over potatoes (French fries) instead of tortilla chips. A Pacific Nortwestern version Of nachos called totchos, or Tot-Chos is a variation in which tortilla chips are replaced with deep-fried or baked tater tots.

Traditional nachos consist of the tortilla chips topped with cheese and jalapeños, as done by Anaya. The modern form of nachos has several possible ingredients with the most common toppings being cheese, guacamole, salsa, sour cream, jalapeños, olives, refried beans, ground beef, chicken, and sometimes lettuce. Lettuce is a less common topping, if added at all. Toppings may be served buffet-style to allow diners to create their own nachos. The topping of the greatest quantity is often the cheese.

Nachos vary from the modern style served in restaurants to the quick and easy nachos sold at concession stands in stadiums. The nachos commonly sold at concession stands in the US consists of tortilla chips topped with pump-able cheese sauce. The cheese sauce comes in condensed form to which water or milk and pepper juice are added. What is contained in the condensed form itself is a trade secret. Another variation of nachos is "dessert nachos". These vary widely, from cinnamon and sugar on pita chips to "s'more nachos" with marshmallow and chocolate on graham crackers, and typically refer to a dessert consisting of scattered toppings on some form of crispy base.

Ingredients

Common toppings include:
 Black beans, pinto beans, or refried beans
 Chile con queso or chili con carne
 Cilantro
 Chives or scallions
 Meat, usually ground beef, sliced steak, chicken, chorizo, or carne asada;  occasionally bacon, pepperoni, corned beef, or Spam
 Guacamole
 Jalapeño or other Capsicum peppers, or hot sauce
 Lettuce
 Lime
 Olives
 Onions
 Garlic
 Pickles
 Pico de gallo or salsa
 Sour cream
 Salada dressing
 Ranch dressing
 Tomatoes

See also the common cheeses used:
 Nacho cheese
 Cheddar cheese
 Mozzarella cheese
 Cotija cheese
 Oaxaca cheese
 Swiss cheese
 Provel cheese
 Monterey Jack
 Pepperjack cheese
 Cheese curd
Nachos with an abundance of toppings are sometimes called "loaded nachos". This type of dish is usually served as an appetizer at bars or restaurants in the United States and elsewhere. Typically, the tortilla chips are arranged on a platter, meat and refried bean toppings are then added, and the entire platter is smothered with shredded cheese. The platter is then put into a broiler or microwave to cause the cheese to melt. The platter is then covered with the cold toppings (shredded lettuce, tomatoes, salsa, jalapeños, etc.) and served immediately.

In Memphis, Tennessee, barbecue nachos are served in most barbecue restaurants, and also at sporting events. Generous portions of barbecued pork shoulder are placed atop tortilla chips, then covered with melted cheese or nacho cheese, barbecue sauce, and sliced jalapeño peppers.

In Hawaii, kalua pork and pineapple nachos are served in many restaurants and bars. Generous portions of kalua pork and pineapple bits are placed atop tortilla chips, then covered with melted cheese or nacho cheese, and varied toppings.

A similar dish that involves tortilla chips and cheese is found in Tex-Mex restaurants. Small bowls of chili con queso or, more commonly, salsa are served with baskets of warm tortilla chips as appetizers.

Nacho cheese

A form of processed cheese sauce mixed with peppers and other spices is often used in place of freshly shredded cheese in institutional or large-scale production settings, such as schools, movie theaters, sports venues, and convenience stores, or wherever using freshly grated cheese may be logistically prohibitive. Though originally formulated as a cheaper and more convenient source of cheese to top nachos, this dip has become popular enough in the U.S. that it is available in some Mexican-themed restaurants, and at major grocery stores, in both name-brand (Frito-Lay, Tostitos, and Taco Bell) and unbranded versions.

In popular culture 
In the United States, National Nacho Day is celebrated on November 6. The International Nacho Festival is held between October 13 and 15 at Piedras Negras, the birthplace of nachos, and features live music, art, cultural activities, and a contest for the biggest nacho of the world which is registered with the Guinness World Records.

On April 21, 2012, the world's biggest serving of nachos was made by Centerplate at the University of Kansas in Lawrence, Kansas.

See also

 List of hors d'oeuvre
 List of maize dishes
 Mexican cuisine
 Cuisine of California
 Nacho cheese
 Nacho Cheese Doritos
 Tex-Mex cuisine

Notes

1.Anaya's son, Ignacio Anaya, Jr., is quoted as saying "My father was maître d' and he said 'Let me go quick and fix something for you.' He went into the kitchen, picked up tostadas, grated some cheese on them—Wisconsin cheese, the round one—and put them under the salamander (a broiling unit that browns the top of foods). He pulled them out after a couple of minutes, all melted, and put on a slice of jalapeño."

References

Further reading
 Dunne, Mike. (January 28, 2004). "One spicy tale: 'Macho Nachos'". Sacramento Bee, p. F1.
 Nickel, Sandra and Oliver Dominguez. (2020). Nacho's Nachos: The Story Behind the World's Favorite Snack.

External links
 
 
 

Appetizers
Cheese dishes
Dips (food)
Maize dishes
Mexican cuisine
Tex-Mex cuisine
Tortilla-based dishes
American snack foods
Cuisine of the Southwestern United States